William Edward Reid (born ) is a Canadian television and podcasting personality. He is known for his music and comedy videos on the World Wide Web and for his musical children's series "Pancake Manor," with over 1.8 billion views. Billy Reid is also a musician, filmmaker, and former TV host. Billy Reid was born in Victoria, British Columbia.

Film and television

Billy Reid is also among the first group of internet personalities to make a transition from the internet into network television. Along with Lara Doucette of Tiki Bar TV, Billy hosted the Canadian series Exposure, a show that featured the best viral videos from the internet, part of the 2007 summer/fall lineup on the CBC. In March 2008, Reid was one of the first YouTubers invited by the YouTube staff to edit the homepage and choose the featured videos.

Reid collaborated with YouTubers Rhett and Link for "T-Shirt War" a commercial in which they used 222 T-shirts with unique designs. "T-shirt War" won in Best Online Promotion at the Apparel Industry category at the 2010 Spirit Awards.  Following the success of the original, Reid and the original crew were hired to produce a national television and cinema spot for McDonald's and Coca-Cola with the same T-shirt War theme. The commercial was also uploaded on YouTube and entitled "T-shirt War 2.” Billy created the art direction, design, as well as the sound effects for both videos.

Billy Reid also collaborated again with Rhett and Link on Brink, hosted by Josh Zepps, on the Science Channel. They created three music videos Space Junk, Robot Girlfriend, and Hello - The Seti Song. He created art and animation for all three videos. He also produced, co-wrote, provided vocals on "Hello - The Seti Song."

In the spring of 2010 Reid became the spokesperson for Frito Lay Canada's Doritos Viralocity Contest. The nation-wide competition asked Canadians to name the company's newest flavour of the tortilla-based chip product and create a 60-second online video. Billy was interviewed on many news and Canadian morning talk shows, including Webnation hosted by Amber MacArthur.

Billy's work has appeared on MTV, The Comedy Network, VH1's Best Week Ever, Sketch with Kevin McDonald, CBC On Demand, Gemini Awards and The Science Channel.

Children's Entertainment

Pancake Manor
Reid created the children's music and educational YouTube series with Reb Stevenson. The first music video aired on YouTube on July 23, 2011, and as of Nov 2021, the show is in its tenth season. The YouTube channel has over 1.8 billion video views and over 2.6 million subscribers. In 2013 Stevenson revealed in a television interview that the puppets were actually designed by Reid a few years before he knew they would be used for a children's show.

In 2012, YouTube selected Pancake Manor, along with 100 other creators to produce original Olympics-themed clips for its Live in London promotion.

In 2013, YouTube again invited Pancake Manor to create a video celebrating geek culture. Their video was about the seven planets of our solar system.

In 2020, Pancake Manor signed with children's entertainment company Moonbug Entertainment. Pancake Manor has since been featured alongside other Moonbug brands including CocoMelon and Blippi.

The show has featured many Internet personalities, including Rhett and Link and iJustine

Music

Very Tasteful
June 7, 2009, Billy Reid (under his pseudonym "Very Tasteful") independently released Very Tasteful : Vol 1, an online comedy album the featuring the popular song Lip Syncing to The Song.

Self-Titled
June 15, 2009, Billy Reid independently released "The Sights & The Sounds", a collection of his pop songs featuring the title track The Sights & The Sounds.

Rhett and Link
Jan 10, 2010 "Rhett & Link - Up to this Point" is released featuring the Billy Reid co-produced song Hello - The Seti Song. The album is available on iTunes Store, Amazon, Spotify, and most online music stores.

Pancake Manor
"Pancake Manor",(Sept 11, 2012) is his first children's music album. It features the popular songs Shapes and Let's Count 123.

"Two", (Jan 30, 2014) The album features the popular songs Count to 10 and Pancake Party.

"Colors!", (Nov 19, 2014) The first themed children's album for "Pancake Manor," It features the popular song Pink, co-written and sung by Reb Stevenson.

"Happy and We Know It", (Jan 12, 2017) is the fourth "Pancake Manor" album, featuring the popular songs Old Macdonald Had a Farm and Five Little Monkeys Jumping on the Bed.

"Shake It Up" (June 1, 2019) is the fifth "Pancake Manor" album.

"Scrambled Eggs For All " (Sep 25, 2020) is the sixth "Pancake Manor" album, and the first to be released under label Moonbug Entertainment.

"Pancake Manor Español, Vol. 1" (March 26, 2021) is their first Spanish album, featuring many translated nursery rhymes.

References

External links
 Billy Reid's Official Website and Blog
 

1977 births
Living people
Canadian television hosts
Canadian Internet celebrities
People from Victoria, British Columbia